Zonda Department (Spanish: Departamento Zonda) is an administrative department of San Juan Province in Argentina. Zonda is located in the south of the province, bordered by Ullum Department to the north, Sarmiento Department to the south, Calingasta Department to the east, and Pocito Department and Rivadavia Department to the west.

As of the 2010 INDEC census, Zonda has a population of 4,863, with a density of 2.6 people per square kilometer. It is one of the most sparsely populated regions in the province. The largest settlement within Zonda is concentrated towards the northeast of the department in the village of Villa Basilio Nievas, which is also known simply as "Zonda". Much of the west of the department has a mountainous, rugged terrain that is sparsely populated.

The name of the department comes from indigenous roots, meaning "high sky". Its name refers to the warm wind characteristic of the province. Zonda has a hilly landscape with sparse vegetation and its economy centers around wine and fruit cultivation, as well as tourism.

History 
Settlement of the region dates back to the Ullum-Zonda, a community of the Huarpe people of the first millenium. Their presence in the region was characterized by agricultural practices and the production of ceramics. When the Spanish arrived in the region in the 16th century, following the establishment of San Juan de la Frontera, they did not immediately settle in Zonda. As time progressed and the empire expanded, the Huarpe people of the area began to disappear.

The late 17th and 18th centuries saw the beginning of Spanish agricultural conversion of the region, when land owners such as Matias Sanchez de Loria and Cornelius Albarracín (maternal grandfather of Domingo Faustino Sarmiento) began using the land to cultivate grapes and olives.

Because the region has been sparsely populated compared to other regions within Argentina, it was initially part of a larger department within San Juan Province which contained the settlements of Marquesado (in present day Rivadavida) and Villa Ibáñez. Marquesado had been founded in the late 19th century by the Echezarreta brothers, and it popularized the Quebranda de Zonda, a ravine on the district's eastern boarder, as a summer resort within the province. Zonda did not become an independent department until the 20th century, when a 1935 act separated it from Rivadavida. Its official borders were not defined until 1942, when the organic municipal act of September 4 was enacted. The department's largest settlement, Villa Basilio Nievas, was established as the government seat of Zonda.

Geography 

It is bordered by the departments of Ullum, Sarmiento, Rivadavia, Pocito, and Calingasta.
The department has a mountainous landscape, and is dominated by foothills, or precordillera, of the Andes. Its western boarder is defined by the Sierra de Marquesado and Sierra Chica de Zonda, mountain range, separate Zonda from its neighboring departments of Rivadavia and Pocitot. The Sierra del Tontal constitutes the department's western boarder with Calingasta. Within the Sierra del Tontal the Chacay and las Cuevas rivers flow into the Sasso River (Spanish: Río Sasso), a tributary of the San Juan River. Its border to the north with Ullum Department is divided by the San Juan River, along which sit the Punta Negra and Los Caracoles dams. The highest mountain peak within Zonda is the Blanco de las Cuevas, reaching 4190 meters in height.

In the mountainous western part of the department, the fauna includes cougar, guanacos, condors, eagles, falcons, and owls. The department's natural flora is characterized by prosopis, larrea, genista, totora, and typha.

Economy 
Agriculture is the main economic activity of the department. Around 1950 ha of land are used for agricultural cultivation. Grapes and other fruits, such as blueberries, almonds, plums, and melon. Olive trees, common vegetables, cereals, animal feed, and lumber trees are also cultivated. As much of the agricultural output of the department comes from vineyards, the dominant industrial aspect is represented by wineries.

References 

Departments of San Juan Province, Argentina
1935 establishments in Argentina